The Teledyne Ryan Model 324 Scarab is a jet-powered reconnaissance UAV developed in the United States in the 1980s for sale to Egypt. The Scarab is a medium-range reconnaissance asset, similar in operational concept to the old Ryan FireFly UAVs, but implemented with improved technology. It was designed to Egyptian Air Force requirements, and was first flown in 1988. 56 were delivered and the type remains in service. It is a neat UAV with low-midbody-mounted swept wings, a twin-fin tail, and a rear-mounted Teledyne CAE 373-8C turbojet engine with the intake on the rear spine of the UAV. Launch is by RATO booster, and recovery by parachute. The aircraft's guidance is pre-programmed, but a radio-control backup system is provided.

Specifications

References
This article contains material that originally came from the web article Unmanned Aerial Vehicles by Greg Goebel, which exists in the Public Domain.

1980s United States military reconnaissance aircraft
Unmanned aerial vehicles of the United States
Scarab